Thomas Tippett (10 July 1904 – 1997) was an English footballer who played as a forward for Middlesbrough, Craghead United, Newcastle United, Doncaster Rovers, Rochdale, Port Vale, and West Ham United.

Career
Tippett played for Twizzell United, Middlesbrough, Craghead United (in three spells), Newcastle United and, after having trials with Stoke City and Grimsby Town, joined Doncaster Rovers and then Rochdale. He joined Port Vale in June 1931. He scored eight goals in 31 Second Division games in the 1931–32 season, but was criticized for his lack of goals. He fell ill in August 1932 and failed to regain his first team spot, scoring three goals in only nine league and cup games in the 1932–33 season. He left The Old Recreation Ground and transferred to West Ham United in May 1933.

Career statistics
Source:

References

1904 births
1997 deaths
Footballers from Gateshead
English footballers
Association football forwards
Middlesbrough F.C. players
Craghead United F.C. players
Newcastle United F.C. players
Doncaster Rovers F.C. players
Rochdale A.F.C. players
Port Vale F.C. players
West Ham United F.C. players
English Football League players